The men's 20 miles walk event at the 1966 British Empire and Commonwealth Games was held on 5 August in Kingston, Jamaica. It was the first time that racewalking was held at the Games.

Results

References

Athletics at the 1966 British Empire and Commonwealth Games
1966